Staake /stæk/ is a surname. Notable people with the surname include:

Bob Staake (born 1957), American illustrator, cartoonist, children's book author, and designer
Paul Staake (1898–1971), American football coach and college administrator
Ryan Staake (born 1984), American director